Illouz is a surname. Notable people with the surname include:

 Eva Illouz (born 1961), Israeli sociologist
 Yves-Gérard Illouz (1929–2015), French plastic surgeon

French-language surnames
Surnames of Arabic origin